Animomyia is a genus of moths in the family Geometridae erected by Harrison Gray Dyar Jr. in 1908.

Species
 Animomyia dilatata Rindge, 1974
 Animomyia hardwicki Rindge, 1974
 Animomyia minuta Rindge, 1974
 Animomyia morta Dyar, 1908
 Animomyia nuda Rindge, 1974
 Animomyia smithii (Pearsall, 1910)
 Animomyia turgida Rindge, 1974

References

Nacophorini
Geometridae genera